George Horatio Mudie (26 November 1915 – 8 June 2002) was a West Indian international cricketer who played in one Test in 1934–35.

References

1915 births
2002 deaths
West Indies Test cricketers
People from Saint Catherine Parish
Jamaican cricketers
Jamaica cricketers